Gecatogomphius is an extinct genus of Middle Permian captorhinid with multiple tooth rows known from the Kirov Oblast and the Republic of Tatarstan of Russia.

Description
Gecatogomphius is known from the holotype PIN 1156/1, a three-dimensionally preserved nearly complete lower jaw found on the bank of the Vyatka River near the town of Gorki in the Kirov Oblast, and from PIN 4310/1 a single maxillary tooth plate from Berezovye Polyanki in Tatarstan. The preserved part of the jawbone fragment has a length of 80 millimeters and is posteriorly expanded to form a very broad shelf that bears five rows of bulbous teeth.

Gecatogomphius is part of the biostratigraphic Ocher Assemblage which is characteristic for sediments of the East European Platform with an uppermost Lower Permian (Upper Kungurian) and lower Middle Permian (Roadian) age.

Etymology
Gecatogomphius was first named by B. P. Vjushkov and Pjotr K. Chudinov in 1957 and the type species is Gecatogomphius kavejevi. The generic name is derived from hecato, Greek for "hundred", and gomphos, Greek for "peg", "nail" or "wedge", referring to the large number of teeth in the jaw. The specific name kavejevi is in honour of the finder of the type specimen, the Soviet geologist Mazit S. Kaveev.

References

Permian reptiles
Fossil taxa described in 1957
Extinct animals of Russia
Captorhinids
Prehistoric reptile genera